Barış Alper Yılmaz (born 23 May 2000) is a Turkish footballer who plays as a winger for Galatasaray and the Turkey national team.

Club career
He started football in 2012 in Rize İl Özel İdarespor. In 2017, he was transferred to Ankara Demirspor, one of the 3rd League teams. After playing here for 3 seasons, he was transferred to Ankara Keçiörengücü, which was promoted to the 1st League.

Galatasaray
He transferred to Galatasaray on 9 July 2021.

International career
He played 3 matches with the Turkey under-21 national football team and scored 1 goal. He debuted with the senior Turkey national team in a 6–0 win over Gibraltar on 12 November 2021.

References

External links
 

2000 births
Living people
Turkish footballers
Turkey international footballers
Turkey youth international footballers
Galatasaray S.K. footballers
Süper Lig players
Association football midfielders
TFF First League players
Sportspeople from Rize